Ray Anthony (born Raymond Antonini; January 20, 1922) is an American bandleader, trumpeter, songwriter, and actor. He is the last surviving member of the Glenn Miller Orchestra.

Biography 
Anthony was born to an Italian family in Bentleyville, Pennsylvania, but moved with his family to Cleveland, Ohio, where he studied the trumpet. He played in Glenn Miller's band from 1940 to 1941  and appeared in the Glenn Miller movie Sun Valley Serenade before joining the U.S. Navy during World War II. After the war he formed his own group. The Ray Anthony Orchestra became popular in the early 1950s with "The Bunny Hop", "Hokey Pokey", and the theme from Dragnet. He had a No. 2 chart hit with a recording of the tune "At Last" in 1952; it was the highest charting pop version of the song in the U.S. His 1962 recording 'Worried Mind' received considerable radio airplay.

In 1953, Anthony and his orchestra were featured when Helen O'Connell and Bob Eberly headlined a summer replacement program for Perry Como's CBS television show.

From 1953 to 1954, Anthony was musical director of the television series TV's Top Tunes, and he also appeared as himself in the 1955 film Daddy Long Legs. In 1955 he married actress Mamie Van Doren. Their son Perry Ray was born on March 18, 1956. Anthony then began expanding his acting career. In 1956–1957 he starred in a short-lived television variety show, The Ray Anthony Show. Anthony also appeared in several films during the late 1950s, including The Five Pennies (in which he portrayed Jimmy Dorsey), and Van Doren's movies High School Confidential (as "Bix") and Girls Town. In the 1959–1960 television season, he guest-starred in the episode "Operation Ramrod" of David Hedison's espionage series Five Fingers on NBC. Anthony and his band appeared in the movie The Girl Can't Help It (1956). In 1957, Anthony and his orchestra recorded the music score for the film This Could Be The Night, with vocals performed by Julie Wilson.

After Van Doren filed for divorce in 1958, citing "cruelty", they finally divorced in 1961, and Anthony's brief film career ended at about the same time. However, he continued his musical career and had another hit record with the theme from Peter Gunn, which reached No. 8 on the Billboard Hot 100 pop chart. The B-side of the single hit "Peter Gun theme" contains the Norwegian song "Tango For two" written by Bjarne Amdahl and Alf Prøysen. "Tango for two` became one of the most requested songs on Radio Luxembourg in 1958. At the end the radio DJ's became so tired of playing the song that they smashed the record. Among his pianists was Allen "Puddler" Harris, a native of Franklin Parish, Louisiana, who had been a member of the original Ricky Nelson band, and Kellie Greene, who also played the vibraphone. Anthony's compositions include "Thunderbird", "The Bunny Hop", "Trumpet Boogie", "Big Band Boogie", and "Mr. Anthony's Boogie".

Anthony was considered one of the most modern big band leaders. In the lyrics to "Opus One", which imagine a number of players performing the song, he is cited along with Les Brown and his Band of Renown:

If Mr. Les Brown can make it renowned
And Ray Anthony could rock it for me

He turned 100 on January 20, 2022.

Later career
In the early 1980s, Anthony formed Big Band '80s, with other members of the band including Buddy Rich, Harry James, Les Brown, and Alvino Rey.

Anthony, who has been honored with a star on the Hollywood Walk of Fame, continues to be active as a bandleader and musician. His later works tended to break away from the Big Band jazz style of his earlier days, ranging from MOR and lounge music to blues, film and television themes.

Ray Anthony was a close friend of the late Hugh Hefner, and he has appeared in numerous episodes of The Girls Next Door.

Selected discography

References

External links
Ray Anthony Interview NAMM Oral History Library (2008)

Ray Anthony biography at SwingMusic.net
Ray Anthony biography at SpaceAgePop.com

1922 births
21st-century American male musicians
21st-century trumpeters
Ace Records (United States) artists
American centenarians
American jazz bandleaders
American jazz trumpeters
American male film actors
American male jazz musicians
American male television actors
American male trumpeters
American music arrangers
Big band bandleaders
Capitol Records artists
Glenn Miller Orchestra members
Jazz musicians from Pennsylvania
Living people
Men centenarians
Military personnel from Pennsylvania
Musicians from Pittsburgh
People from Bentleyville, Pennsylvania
Singers from Pennsylvania
United States Navy personnel of World War II